Arthrostyloecia is an extinct genus of bryozoan of the family Arthrostylidae, that lived in the Ordovician period. Its colonies are articulated, distinctively containing ball and socket joints. It contains a single species, Arthrostyloecia nitida.

References

Prehistoric bryozoan genera